Mason is a town in Tipton County, Tennessee. The population was 1,609 at the 2010 census. Mason is located along U.S. Route 70, and is home to a federal detention facility.

History
The first rail service in Tipton County was established in December 1855, when the Memphis and Ohio Railroad completed the route from Memphis to Nashville, running through what is now the town of Mason.

Trinity Church in Mason, built in 1870, was designed by English architect James B. Cook and is listed on the National Register of Historic Places.

In 2022 the State Government of Tennessee fought to gain financial control over the town government. In May of that year the town and the state government had a deal so that the financial control remained with the town government.

Geography
Mason is located at  (35.410262, -89.541366).

Demographics

2020 census

As of the 2020 United States census, there were 1,337 people, 339 households, and 246 families residing in the town.

2000 census
As of the census of 2000, there were 1,089 people, 210 households, and 153 families residing in the town. The racial makeup of the town was 40.96% White, 51.52% African American, 1.84% Native American, 0.73% Asian, 2.11% from other races, and 2.85% from two or more races. Hispanic or Latino of any race were 5.23% of the population.

There were 210 households, out of which 41.9% had children under the age of 18 living with them, 41.0% were married couples living together, 22.9% had a female householder with no husband present, and 26.7% were non-families. 23.8% of all households were made up of individuals, and 10.5% had someone living alone who was 65 years of age or older. The average household size was 2.68 and the average family size was 3.12.

In the town, the population was spread out, with 16.1% under the age of 18, 16.6% from 18 to 24, 49.2% from 25 to 44, 12.0% from 45 to 64, and 6.1% who were 65 years of age or older. The median age was 31 years. For every 100 females, there were 276.8 males. For every 100 females age 18 and over, there were 327.1 males.

The median income for a household in the town was $32,404, and the median income for a family was $40,139. Males had a median income of $31,827 versus $25,938 for females. The per capita income for the town was $15,643. About 9.5% of families and 13.4% of the population were below the poverty line, including 18.4% of those under age 18 and 26.8% of those age 65 or over.

Notable people 
John W. Boyd (ca. 1852-1932) ex-slave, became an attorney in Mason; served repeatedly on the County Court and two terms in the General Assembly (1881-84)
Harvey Hendrick (1897-1941), Major League Baseball former Baseball player and member of the New York Yankees first World Series championship team 1923
Beebe Steven Lynk (1872–1948) professor of medical Latin botany and materia medica; born in Mason
John Shelton Wilder (1921-2010), state senator and Lieutenant Governor of Tennessee, born in Mason

References

Towns in Tipton County, Tennessee
Towns in Tennessee
Memphis metropolitan area
Majority-minority cities and towns in Tennessee